Richárd Csepregi (born 27 July 1985) is a Hungarian former professional footballer who played as a midfielder.

External links 
 HLSZ
 

1985 births
Living people
Association football midfielders
Hungarian footballers
Ferencvárosi TC footballers
Soroksár SC players
Footballers from Budapest